Alton LaVar Wade (born March 1934) is a retired American educational administrator.

Wade was born in Leamington, Utah.  As a young man Wade served as a missionary in the Central States Mission of the Church of Jesus Christ of Latter-day Saints (LDS Church).  He earned a bachelor's degree from Brigham Young University (BYU) and a master's degree from California State University, Long Beach.  Wade pursued graduate work at UCLA as well.  He also earned a doctorate in education from BYU.

Wade served as a teacher, vice-principal and principal of the Church College of New Zealand.  He then served as an administrator for the LDS Church schools in the Pacific islands and then as a zone administrator for the Church Educational System.

Wade served as president of Dixie College from 1980 to 1986.  During his tenure at Dixie College, the Dixie Center was developed and the college had its first ever NJCAA championship, specifically in basketball.

Wade then served as president of Brigham Young University–Hawaii from 1986 to 1994.  During his tenure, BYU–Hawaii was organized into three colleges: the College of Arts and Sciences, the School of Business and the School of Education.  Wade moved BYU–Hawaii away from vocational education to being more focused on truly collegiate level education.  From 1994 to 2000 he was the Vice President of Student Life at BYU.

Wade has served in many callings in the LDS Church, including as a stake president.  From 2000 to 2003 he served as president of the church's Washington DC South Mission.

Wade and his wife, the former Diana Daniels, are the parents of eight children.

References

External links
 
Dixie College bio of Wade
BYU-Hawaii history highlighting advances under various presidents
 
Dixie College page from when Wade became president

1935 births
20th-century Mormon missionaries
21st-century Mormon missionaries
American leaders of the Church of Jesus Christ of Latter-day Saints
American Mormon missionaries in the United States
Brigham Young University alumni
Brigham Young University staff
California State University, Long Beach alumni
Church Educational System instructors
Utah Tech University people
Living people
Mission presidents (LDS Church)
Presidents of Brigham Young University–Hawaii
University of California, Los Angeles alumni
American expatriates in New Zealand
Latter Day Saints from Utah
Latter Day Saints from California
Latter Day Saints from Hawaii
People from Leamington, Utah